John Paul Jones (born John Paul; July 6, 1747 July 18, 1792) was a Scottish-American naval captain who was the United States' first well-known naval commander in the American Revolutionary War. He was a Freemason, and made many friends among U.S political elites (including John Hancock and Benjamin Franklin) as well as enemies (who accused him of piracy), and his actions in British waters during the Revolution earned him an international reputation that persists to this day. As such, he is sometimes referred to as the "Father of the American Navy" (a title also credited to John Barry, John Adams, and sometimes Joshua Humphreys).

Jones was born and raised in Scotland, became a sailor at the age of thirteen, and served as commander of several merchantmen. After having killed one of his mutinous crew members with a sword, he fled to the Colony of Virginia and around 1775 joined the newly founded Continental Navy in their fight against the Kingdom of Great Britain in the American Revolutionary War. He commanded U.S. Navy ships stationed in France, led one failed assault on Britain, and several attacks on British merchant ships. Left without a command in 1787, he joined the Imperial Russian Navy and obtained the rank of rear admiral.

Early life and training

John Paul (he added "Jones" later in life) was born on the estate of Arbigland near Kirkbean in the Stewartry of Kirkcudbright on the southwest coast of Scotland. His parents married on November 29, 1733, in New Abbey, Kirkcudbrightshire.

John Paul started his maritime career at age 13, sailing out of Whitehaven in the northern English county of Cumberland as apprentice aboard Friendship under Captain Benson. Paul's older brother William Paul had married and settled in Fredericksburg, Virginia. Virginia was the destination of many of the younger Paul's voyages.

For several years, Paul sailed aboard a number of merchant and slave ships, including King George in 1764 as third mate and Two Friends as first mate in 1766. In 1768, he abandoned his prestigious position on the profitable Two Friends while docked in Jamaica. He found his own passage back to Scotland and eventually obtained another position.

John Paul's career was quickly and unexpectedly advanced during his next voyage aboard the brig John, which sailed from port in 1768, when both the captain and a ranking mate suddenly died of yellow fever. Paul managed to navigate the ship back to a safe port, and in reward for this feat the vessel's grateful Scottish owners made him master of the ship and its crew, giving him ten percent of the cargo. He led two voyages to the West Indies before running into difficulty.

During his second voyage in 1770, John Paul had one of his crew flogged after trying to start a mutiny about early payment of wages, leading to accusations that his discipline was "unnecessarily cruel". These claims were initially dismissed, but his favorable reputation was destroyed when the sailor died a few weeks later. John Paul was arrested for his involvement in the man's death. He was imprisoned in Kirkcudbright Tolbooth but later released on bail. The negative effect of this episode on his reputation is indisputable. The local governor encouraged John Paul to leave the area and change his name while on bail. The man who died of his injuries was not a usual sailor but an adventurer from a very influential Scottish family.

Leaving Scotland, John Paul commanded a London-registered vessel named Betsy, a West Indiaman mounting 22 guns, engaging in commercial speculation in Tobago for about 18 months. This came to an end, however, when he killed a mutinous crew member with a sword in a dispute over wages. Years later, in a letter to Benjamin Franklin describing the incident, John Paul claimed that the killing was committed in self-defense, but he was not willing to be tried in an Admiral's Court, where the family of his first victim had been influential.

He felt compelled to flee to Fredericksburg, Virginia, leaving his fortune behind; he also sought to arrange the affairs of his brother, who had died there without leaving any immediate family. About this time, John Paul assumed the surname of Jones (in addition to his original surname). There is a long-held tradition in the state of North Carolina that John Paul adopted the name "Jones" in honor of Willie Jones of Halifax, North Carolina.

From that period, America became "the country of his fond election", as he afterwards expressed himself to Baron Joan Derk van der Capellen tot den Pol. It was not long afterward that John Paul Jones joined the American navy to fight against Britain.

Naval career

American colonies
Sources struggle with this period of Jones's life, especially the specifics of his family situation, making it difficult to pinpoint historically Jones's motivations for emigrating to America. It is not known whether his plans were not developing as expected for the plantation or if he was inspired by a revolutionary spirit. It is known that he was elected to the American Philosophical Society in Philadelphia in 1774.

Jones left for Philadelphia shortly after settling in North America to volunteer his services around 1775 to the newly founded Continental Navy, precursor to the United States Navy. During this time, the Navy and Marines were being formally established, and suitable ship's officers and captains were in great demand. Jones's potential would likely have gone unrecognized were it not for the endorsement of Richard Henry Lee, who knew of his abilities. With help from influential members of the Continental Congress, Jones was appointed as a 1st Lieutenant of the newly converted 24-gun frigate  in the Continental Navy on December 7, 1775.

Revolutionary War command

Early command
Jones sailed from the Delaware River in February 1776 aboard Alfred on the Continental Navy's maiden cruise. It was aboard this vessel that Jones took the honour of hoisting the first U.S. ensign—the Grand Union Flag—over a naval vessel.

The fleet had been expected to cruise along the coast but was ordered instead by Commodore Esek Hopkins to sail for The Bahamas, where Nassau was raided for military supplies. The fleet had an unsuccessful encounter with a British packet ship on their return voyage. Jones was then assigned command of the sloop . Congress had recently ordered the construction of thirteen frigates for the American Navy, one of which was to be commanded by Jones. In exchange for this prestigious command, Jones accepted his commission aboard the smaller Providence. Over the summer of 1776 as commander of Providence, Jones performed various services for the Continental Navy and Congress. These services included the transport of troops, the movement of supplies, and the escort of convoys. During this time, Jones was able to assist a 'brig from Hispaniola' that was being chased by HMS Cerberus and laden with military stores. During a later six-week voyage to Nova Scotia, Jones captured sixteen prizes and inflicted significant damage in the Raid on Canso.

Jones's next command came as a result of Commodore Hopkins's orders to liberate hundreds of American prisoners forced to labour in coal mines in Nova Scotia, and also to raid British shipping. On November 1, 1776, Jones set sail in command of Alfred to carry out this mission. Winter conditions prevented freeing the prisoners, but the mission did result in the capture of Mellish, a vessel carrying a vital supply of winter clothing intended for General John Burgoyne's troops in Canada.

Command of Ranger

Despite his successes at sea, Jones' disagreements with those in authority reached a new level upon arrival in Boston on December 16, 1776. While at the port, he began feuding with Commodore Hopkins, as Jones believed that Hopkins was hindering his advancement by talking down his campaign plans. As a result of this and other frustrations, Jones was assigned the smaller command of the newly constructed  on June 14, 1777, the same day that the new Stars and Stripes flag was adopted.

After making the necessary preparations, Jones sailed for France on November 1, 1777, with orders to assist the American cause however possible. The American commissioners in France were Benjamin Franklin, Silas Deane, and Arthur Lee, and they listened to Jones's strategic recommendations. Britain, however, was able to divert L'Indien away from American hands by exerting pressure to ensure its sale to France instead (which had not yet allied with America). Jones was again left without a command, an unpleasant reminder of his stagnation in Boston from late 1776 until early 1777. It is thought that during this time Jones developed his close friendship with Franklin, whom he greatly admired.

On February 6, 1778, France signed the Treaty of Alliance with America, formally recognizing the independence of the new American republic. Eight days later, Captain Jones's Ranger became the first American naval vessel to be formally saluted by the French, with a nine-gun salute fired from Captain Lamotte-Piquet's flagship. Jones wrote of the event: "I accepted his offer all the more for after all it was a recognition of our independence and in the nation". On April 10, Jones set sail from Brest, France, for the western coasts of Great Britain.

Ranger attacks the British
Jones had some early successes against British merchant shipping in the Irish Sea. He persuaded his crew on April 17, 1778, to participate in an assault on Whitehaven, the town where his maritime career had begun. Jones later wrote about the poor command qualities of his senior officers (having tactfully avoided such matters in his official report): "'Their object', they said, 'was gain not honor'. They were poor: instead of encouraging the morale of the crew, they excited them to disobedience; they persuaded them that they had the right to judge whether a measure that was proposed to them was good or bad". As it happened, contrary winds forced them to abandon the attempt and drive Ranger towards Ireland, causing more trouble for British shipping on the way.

On April 20, Jones learned from captured sailors that the Royal Navy sloop of war  was anchored off Carrickfergus, Ireland. According to the diary of Rangers surgeon, Jones's first intention was to attack the vessel in broad daylight, but his sailors were "unwilling to undertake it" (another incident omitted from the official report). Therefore, the attack took place just after midnight, but the mate responsible for dropping the anchor to halt Ranger right alongside Drake misjudged the timing in the dark (Jones claimed in his memoirs that the man was drunk), so Jones had to cut his anchor cable and run. The wind shifted, and Ranger recrossed the Irish Sea to make another attempt at raiding Whitehaven.

Jones led the assault with two boats of fifteen men just after midnight on April 23, hoping to set fire to and sink all of the ships anchored in Whitehaven's harbour, which numbered between 200 and 400 wooden vessels and consisted of a full merchant fleet and many coal transporters. They also hoped to terrorize the townspeople by lighting further fires. As it happened, the journey to shore was slowed by the shifting wind, as well as a strong ebb tide. They successfully spiked the town's big defensive guns to prevent them being fired, but lighting fires proved difficult, as the lanterns in both boats had run out of fuel. To remedy this, some of the party were sent to raid a public house on the quayside, but the temptation to stop for a quick drink led to a further delay. Dawn was breaking by the time they returned and began the arson attacks, so efforts were concentrated on the coal ship Thompson in the hope that the flames would spread to adjacent vessels, all grounded by the low tide. However, in the twilight, one of the crew slipped away and alerted residents on a harbourside street. A fire alert was sounded, and large numbers of people came running to the quay, forcing the Americans to retreat and extinguishing the flames with the town's two fire-engines. The townspeople's hopes of sinking Jones's boats with cannon fire were dashed because of the prudent spiking.

Jones next crossed the Solway Firth from Whitehaven to Scotland, hoping to hold for ransom Dunbar Douglas, 4th Earl of Selkirk, who lived on St Mary's Isle near Kirkcudbright. The earl, Jones reasoned, could be exchanged for American sailors impressed into the Royal Navy. The earl was discovered to be absent from his estate, so his wife entertained the officers and conducted negotiations. Canadian historian Peter C. Newman gives credit to the governess for protecting the young heir to the Earldom of Selkirk, Thomas Douglas, and to the butler for filling a sack half with coal and topping it up with the family silver, in order to fob off the Americans. Jones claimed that he intended to return directly to his ship and continue seeking prizes elsewhere, but his crew wished to "pillage, burn, and plunder all they could". Ultimately, Jones allowed the crew to seize a silver plate set adorned with the family's emblem to placate their desires, but nothing else. Jones bought the plate when it was later sold off in France, and he returned it to the Earl of Selkirk after the war.

The attacks on St Mary's Isle and Whitehaven resulted in no prizes or profits which would be shared with the crew under normal circumstances. Throughout the mission, the crew acted as if they were aboard a privateer, not a warship, led by Lieutenant Thomas Simpson, Jones's second-in-command.

Return to Ireland

Jones led Ranger back across the Irish Sea, hoping to make another attempt at Drake, still anchored off Carrickfergus. Late in the afternoon of April 24, the ships, roughly equal in firepower, engaged in combat. Earlier in the day, the Americans had captured the crew of a reconnaissance boat and learned that Drake had taken on dozens of soldiers with the intention of grappling and boarding Ranger, so Jones made sure that did not happen, capturing Drake after an hour-long gun battle in which British captain George Burdon was killed. Lieutenant Simpson was given command of Drake for the return journey to Brest. The ships separated during the return journey as Ranger chased another prize, leading to a conflict between Simpson and Jones. Both ships arrived at port safely, but Jones filed for a court-martial of Simpson, keeping him detained on the ship.

Partly through the influence of John Adams, who was still serving as a commissioner in France, Simpson was released from Jones's accusation. Adams implies in his memoirs that the overwhelming majority of the evidence supported Simpson's claims. Adams seemed to believe Jones was hoping to monopolize the mission's glory, especially by detaining Simpson on board while he celebrated the capture with numerous important European dignitaries. Even with the wealth of perspectives, including the commander's, it is difficult to determine what occurred. It is clear, however, that the crew felt alienated by their commander, who might well have been motivated by his pride. Jones believed his intentions were honorable and his actions were strategically essential to the Revolution. Regardless of any controversy surrounding the mission, Rangers capture of Drake was one of the Continental Navy's few significant military victories during the Revolution. Rangers victory became an important symbol of the American spirit and served as an inspiration for the permanent establishment of the United States Navy after the revolution.

Bonhomme Richard

In 1779, Captain Jones took command of the 42-gun , a merchant ship rebuilt and given to America by the French shipping magnate, Jacques-Donatien Le Ray. On August 14, as a vast French and Spanish invasion fleet approached England, he provided a diversion by heading for Ireland at the head of a five-ship squadron including the 36-gun , 32-gun USS Pallas, 12-gun , and Le Cerf, also accompanied by two privateers,  and Granville. When the squadron was only a few days out of Groix, Monsieur separated because of a disagreement between her captain and Jones. Several Royal Navy warships were sent towards Ireland in pursuit of Jones, but on this occasion, he continued right around the north of Scotland into the North Sea. Jones's main problems, as on his previous voyage, resulted from insubordination, particularly by Pierre Landais, captain of Alliance. On September 23, the squadron met a large merchant convoy off the coast of Flamborough Head, East Yorkshire. The 44-gun British frigate  and the 22-gun hired armed ship  placed themselves between the convoy and Jones's squadron, allowing the merchants to escape.

Shortly after 7 p.m. the Battle of Flamborough Head began. Serapis engaged Bonhomme Richard, and Alliance fired from a considerable distance at Countess. Quickly recognizing that he could not win a battle of big guns, and with the wind dying, Jones made every effort to lock Richard and Serapis together (his famous, albeit apocryphal, quotation "I have not yet begun to fight!" was said to have been uttered in reply to a demand to surrender in this phase of the battle). After about an hour, he succeeded, and he began clearing the British decks with his deck guns and his Marine marksmen in the rigging . Alliance sailed past and fired a broadside, doing at least as much damage to Richard as to Serapis. Meanwhile, Countess of Scarborough had enticed Pallas downwind of the main battle, beginning a separate engagement. When Alliance approached this contest, about an hour after it had begun, the badly damaged Countess surrendered.

With Bonhomme Richard burning and sinking, it seems that her ensign was shot away; when one of the officers shouted a surrender, believing his captain to be dead, the British commander asked, seriously this time, if they had struck their colours. Jones later remembered saying something like "I am determined to make you strike", but the words allegedly heard by crew-members and reported in newspapers a few days later were more like: "I may sink, but I'll be damned if I strike". An attempt by the British to board Bonhomme Richard was thwarted, and a grenade caused the explosion of a large quantity of gunpowder on Serapis lower gun-deck. Alliance returned to the main battle, firing two broadsides. Again, these did at least as much damage to Richard as to Serapis, but the tactic worked to the extent that Serapis was unable to move. With Alliance keeping well out of the line of his own great guns, Captain Pearson of Serapis accepted that prolonging the battle could achieve nothing, so he surrendered. Most of Bonhomme Richards crew transferred to other vessels, and after a day and a half of frantic repair efforts, it was decided that the ship could not be saved. Bonhomme Richard was allowed to sink, and Jones took command of Serapis for the trip to the island of Texel in neutral (but American-sympathizing) Holland.

In the following year, King Louis XVI of France honoured Jones with the title "chevalier". Jones accepted the honour and desired the title to be used thereafter: when the Continental Congress in 1787 resolved that a medal of gold be struck in commemoration of his "valour and brilliant services" it was to be presented to "Chevalier John Paul Jones". He also received from Louis XVI a decoration of "l'Institution du Mérite Militaire" and a sword. By contrast, in Britain at this time, he was usually denigrated as a pirate.

Jones was also admitted as an original member of The Society of the Cincinnati in the state of Pennsylvania when it was established in 1783.

Russian service

In June 1782, Jones was appointed to command the 74-gun , but his command fell through when Congress decided to give America to the French as replacement for the wrecked Le Magnifique. As a result, he was given assignment in Europe in 1783 to collect prize money due his former hands. At length, this too expired and Jones was left without prospects for active employment, leading him on April 23, 1787, to enter into the service of the Empress Catherine II of Russia, who placed great confidence in Jones, saying: "He will get to Constantinople". He was granted name as a French subject Павел де Жонес (Pavel de Zhones, Paul de Jones).

Jones avowed his intention, however, to preserve the condition of an American citizen and officer. As a rear admiral aboard the 24-gun flagship Vladimir, he took part in the naval campaign in the Dnieper-Bug Liman (an arm of the Black Sea, into which flow the Southern Bug and Dnieper rivers) against the Turks, in concert with the Dnieper Flotilla commanded by Prince Charles of Nassau-Siegen. Jones (and Nassau-Siegen) repulsed the Ottoman forces from the area, but the jealous intrigues of Nassau-Siegen (and perhaps Jones's own ineptitude for Imperial politics) turned the Russian commander Prince Grigory Potemkin against Jones. 

Jones was recalled to St. Petersburg for the claimed purpose of transfer to a command in the North Sea. Other factors may have included the theoretical resentment of rival officers, some of whom were several ex-British naval officers also in Russian employment, who regarded Jones as a renegade and refused to speak to him.

In April 1789, Jones was accused of raping a 10-year-old girl named Katerina Stepanova. She testified to the police that she had been summoned to his apartment to sell him butter, when he punched her in the face, gagged her with a white handkerchief, and vaginally penetrated her; a regimental surgeon and a midwife both examined her and found evidence to substantiate these physical and sexual assaults. There had been a delay on one day in reporting the rape, which meant the case would ordinarily not continue, due to Russian statutory codes considering any such delay evidence of consent, but Catherine intervened directly to allow the legal proceedings to continue.

Jones responded to the allegations by claiming that he had paid the girl for sex several times, denying that he had deprived her of her virginity, and suggesting she was older than 10. However, Jones would later change his story and claim the accusation was entirely false, stemming from the supposed desire of Katerina's mother, Sophia Fyodorovna, to gain financially from a prominent man. He involved the Count de Segur, the French representative at the Russian court (and also Jones's last friend in the capital), who investigated the accusation and suggested to Potemkin that it was false, and that Jones was the victim of a plot by Prince Charles for his own purposes. Jones went on to gather evidence, producing Katerina's father, Stephan Holtszwarthen, to testify in court that his daughter was 12 and that his wife had left him for another man, lived in a brothel, and was herself promiscuous.

The international pressure applied by American and French connections via the Count de Segur exerted a softening influence on Catherine. She granted him two years leave abroad, a de facto exile. According to Jacob Bell:
The Empress’ actions here proved her priorities. She dismissed a tried naval commander, especially sought out by her agents abroad, during wartime, showing that she merited the allegations against Jones higher than his potential martial service.

During this period he wrote his Narrative of the Campaign of the Liman. 

On June 8, 1788, Jones was awarded the Order of St. Anne, but he left the following month, an embittered man. In 1789 Jones arrived in Warsaw, Poland, where he befriended Tadeusz Kościuszko, a veteran of the American Revolutionary War. Kościuszko advised him to leave the service of the autocratic Russia and serve another power, suggesting Sweden. Despite Kościuszko's backing, the Swedes, while somewhat interested, in the end decided not to recruit Jones. Catherine, who retained a personal enmity for Jones, had blocked his appointment to not just the Swedish navy, but the Danish navy also.

Later life

In May 1790, Jones arrived in Paris. He still retained his position as Russian Rear Admiral, with a corresponding pension which allowed him to remain in retirement until his death two years later. During this time he made several attempts to re-enter the service in the Russian Navy. However, Catherine did not respond to his letters, explaining to their go-between Baron von Grimm that Jones' service record was not exceptional and that Russian seamen refused to serve under him, because he had raped a girl.

By this time, his memoirs had been published in Edinburgh. Inspired by them, James Fenimore Cooper and Alexandre Dumas later wrote their own adventure novels: Cooper's 1824 novel The Pilot contains fictionalised accounts of Jones's maritime activities, and Dumas' Captain Paul is a follow-up novel to The Pilot, published in 1846. According to Walter Herrick:
Jones was a sailor of indomitable courage, of strong will, and of great ability in his chosen career.... He was also a hypocrite, a brawler, a rake, and a professional and social climber.

Death
In June 1792, Jones was appointed U.S. Consul to treat with the Dey of Algiers for the release of American captives. Before Jones was able to fulfill his appointment, he was found dead lying face-down on his bed in his third-floor Paris apartment, No. 19 Rue de Tournon, on July 18, 1792. He was 45 years old. The cause of death was interstitial nephritis. A small procession of servants, friends and loyal family walked his body  for burial. He was buried in Paris at the Saint Louis Cemetery, which belonged to the French royal family. Four years later, France's revolutionary government sold the property, and the cemetery was forgotten.

Exhumation and reburial

In 1905, Jones' remains were identified by U.S. Ambassador to France General Horace Porter, who had searched for six years to track down the body using faulty copies of Jones's burial record. After Jones's death, Frenchman Pierrot Francois Simmoneau donated over 460 francs to mummify the body. It was preserved in alcohol and interred in a lead coffin "in the event that should the United States decide to claim his remains, they might more easily be identified." Porter knew what to look for in his search. With the aid of an old map of Paris, Porter's team, which included anthropologist Louis Capitan, identified the site of the former St. Louis Cemetery for Alien Protestants. Sounding probes were used to search for lead coffins, and five coffins were ultimately exhumed. The third, unearthed on April 7, 1905, was later identified by a post-mortem examination by Doctors Capitan and Georges Papillault as being that of Jones. The autopsy confirmed the original listing of cause of death. The face was later compared to a bust by Jean-Antoine Houdon.

On approaching the American coastline, seven U.S. Navy battleships joined the procession escorting Jones's body back to America. On April 24, 1906, Jones's coffin was installed in Bancroft Hall at the United States Naval Academy, Annapolis, Maryland, following a ceremony in Dahlgren Hall, presided by President Theodore Roosevelt who gave a speech paying tribute to Jones and holding him up as an example to the officers of the Navy. On January 26, 1913, the captain's remains were finally re-interred in a bronze and marble sarcophagus designed by Sylvain Salières at the Naval Academy Chapel in Annapolis.

Posthumous pardon at Whitehaven
Jones was given an honorary pardon in 1999 by the port of Whitehaven for his raid on the town, in the presence of Lieutenant Steve Lyons representing the U.S. Naval Attaché to the UK, and Yuri Fokine the Russian Ambassador to the UK. The U.S. Navy was also awarded the Freedom of the Port of Whitehaven, the only time the honour has been granted in its 400-year history. The pardon and freedom were arranged by Gerard Richardson as part of the launch of the series of Maritime Festival. Richardson's of Whitehaven, a wine and coffee merchant in the town, is now the honorary consulate to the U.S. Navy for the Town and Port of Whitehaven. The consul is Rear Admiral (retired) U.S. Navy Steve Morgan, and the deputy consul is Rob Romano.

In popular culture
 In 1923, Franklin Delano Roosevelt wrote a screenplay about Jones and sent it to Paramount Pictures founder Adolph Zukor, who politely rejected it.
 Robert Stack portrayed Jones in the 1959 film John Paul Jones.
 The Longest Johns have a song dedicated to Jones on their 2016 album Written in Salt.

See also

 Bibliography of early American naval history
 Commodore John Hazelwood, commander of the Continental Navy and Pennsylvania Navy during the Philadelphia campaign
 John Paul Jones Cottage Museum, birthplace of Jones in Scotland
 John Paul Jones House, residence in New Hampshire during construction of America
Commissioned 1956; decommissioned 1982
Commissioned in 1993.

References

Bibliography
 
 .
 .
 .
 , 482 pp; original from Univ. California.
 .
 , 2 vols.
 .
 .

 .
 .
 .
  Herrick, Jr. "Jones, John Paul " in John A. Garraty, Encyclopedia of American Biography (1974) pp 598–599. online
 
 , 549 pp.
 .
 Sherburne, John H. The Life and Character of John Paul Jones. Adriance, Sherman & Co. Publishing. New York, pp. 10, 1851.
 .

Further reading 
 , 271 pp.
 , 289 pp.
  320 pp.
 , 408 pp.

External links

 .
 .
 Excerpts form the Journals of my Campaign – John Paul Jones
 John Paul Jones Museum
 Official report by Jones from aboard Serapis in Holland (1779)
 The Best Quote Jones Never Wrote
 John Paul Jones and Asymmetric Warfare
 Battle of Flamborough Head
 Jones's attack upon Whitehaven, as reported in Lloyd's Evening Post, 1778
 The American Revolution Institute

1747 births
1792 deaths
18th-century American diplomats
18th-century American naval officers
18th-century Scottish people
United States Navy personnel of the American Revolution
American sailors
Burials in Maryland
Congressional Gold Medal recipients
Continental Navy officers
Hall of Fame for Great Americans inductees
Imperial Russian Navy admirals
Les Neuf Sœurs
Military personnel from Fredericksburg, Virginia
People from Dumfries and Galloway
Recipients of the Order of St. Anna
Scottish emigrants to the United States
Scottish Freemasons
Scottish admirals
Mummies
Members of the American Philosophical Society